Richard Dawson (died c. 1800) was a soldier and administrator who served as the second Lieutenant Governor of the Isle of Man.

Career
Dawson served in the Royal Engineers reaching the rank of Major in 1772. From 1775 Dawson acted as Lieutenant Governor and Deputy to the Governor of the Isle of Man. Promoted to Colonel in 1783, he retired to Canterbury in Kent in 1790. He was given the rank of Major-General in 1793 and Lieutenant General in 1798 but died two years later.

His wife died following a house fire in 1804.

References

1800 deaths
Lieutenant Governors of the Isle of Man
Year of birth unknown
British Army lieutenant generals
Royal Engineers officers